The 1951 A Group was the third season of the A Football Group, the top Bulgarian professional league for association football clubs, since its establishment in 1948.

Overview
It was contested by 12 teams, and CSKA Sofia won the championship.

League standings

Results

Top scorers

Champions
CSKA Sofia

References
Bulgaria - List of final tables (RSSSF)
Bulgarian Football Archive - bulgarian-football.com

First Professional Football League (Bulgaria) seasons
Bulgaria
1
Bulgaria
1